Pisarevo is a rural locality (a village) and the administrative centre of Pisarevsky Selsoviet, Sharansky District, Bashkortostan, Russia. The population was 288 as of 2010. There are 6 streets.

Geography 
Pisarevo is located 23 km north of Sharan (the district's administrative centre) by road. Roshcha is the nearest rural locality.

References 

Rural localities in Sharansky District